The 2011–12 Trinidad and Tobago FA Trophy was the 82nd season of the FA Trophy, which is the oldest football competition for teams in Trinidad and Tobago. San Juan Jabloteh entered as the tournament's defending champion, who defeated North East Stars 1–0 in the 2010–11 final at Marvin Lee Stadium. The number of entrants in the tournament was expanded by the Trinidad and Tobago Football Association to allow four teams from the Secondary Schools Football League to compete in the competition against semi-professional and professional football clubs. The tournament began on 29 January 2012 with 36 teams competing in single elimination matches and concluded on 25 March 2012.

Qualification
The tournament featured teams from the top three levels of the football pyramid. These three levels and 9 leagues, namely the TT Pro League, National Super League, Central FA's Premier Division, Eastern FA's Premier Division, Eastern Counties' Football Union, Northern FA's Premier Division, Southern FA's Premier Division, Tobago FA's Premier Division, and the Secondary School Football League each have their own separate qualification process to trim their ranks down to their final team delegations.

All eight teams from the TT Pro League entered the competition. The top six following the 2011 National Super League season also met qualification. In addition, the six regional football associations were awarded three qualification positions. For the first time in the competition, four teams qualified from the Secondary Schools Football League.

The following clubs qualified for the 82nd edition of the FA Trophy:

Schedule
The schedule for the 2011–12 FA Trophy, as announced by the Trinidad and Tobago Football Association:

Results
All matches were played over two 45 minute halves, and in the process if the match were drawn at the end of regulation time, then two additional 15-minute halves were used, and if necessary, penalty kicks if still drawn after extra time.

First round
The draw for the most prestigious knockout tournament held by the Trinidad and Tobago Football Association was made on 20 January 2012 at its head office in Port of Spain, Trinidad with ties played in the week beginning 23 January 2012. As a result of the random draw, two TT Pro League clubs were drawn into the first round of the competition with Caledonia AIA facing Uprising Youths and Defence Force squaring off with St. Anthony's College. However, both clubs progressed into the second round with the Morvant/Laventille Stallions recording a 4–1 victory and the Teteron Boys narrowly defeating the Secondary Schools Football League team 3–2.

Second round
The draw for the second round took place on 31 January 2012 and involved the four winning teams from the first round and the remaining 28 teams that received byes into the second round. These were from the following levels:

 8 from Level 1 (TT Pro League)
 6 from Level 2 (National Super League)
 15 from Level 3 (Regional Football Association Leagues)
 3 from the Secondary Schools Football League

Matches in the second round were played in the week commencing 5 February 2012. The TT Pro League clubs progressed into the third round draw with relative ease. Michael Edwards of Defence Force recorded five goals in a rout over Makeking United 11–0. In addition, San Juan Jabloteh defeated El Dorado East with a 5–0 win following a hat-trick from Willis Plaza, W Connection dominated KC Perseverance by a score of 7–0, and North East Stars claimed victory over Dalthea Copious Suns 5–1. Police and St. Ann's Rangers later became the fifth and sixth Pro League teams to advance with wins over Youth Stars and WASA respectively. Caledonia AIA later joined their fellow professional clubs with a narrow 1–0 victory over 1.FC Santa Rosa. However, T&TEC became the first Pro League to fall to a giant-killer after the Electricity Boys tasted defeat 1–0 to St. Francois Nationals of the National Super League.

Third round
The draw for the third round took place on 9 February 2012 and involved the 16 winning teams from the second round. These were from the following levels:

 7 from Level 1 (TT Pro League)
 4 from Level 2 (National Super League)
 4 from Level 3 (2 CFA Premier Division, 1 NFA Premier Division, 1 SFA Premier Division)
 1 from the Secondary Schools Football League (Scarborough Secondary)

Matches in the third round were played in the week commencing 26 February 2012. Following the draw, three matches featured all-Pro League encounters with Defence Force advancing with a narrow 3–2 win over Police, Caledonia AIA upending North East Stars 4–3 on penalties after the match ended 1–1 in regulation, and W Connection eliminating the defending champions San Juan Jabloteh 1–0 with a goal from Shahdon Winchester. However, St. Ann's Rangers would not advance to the quarterfinals following a 3–1 defeat to Joe Public from the National Super League. Scarborough Secondary, the lone Secondary Schools Football League team remaining in the competition, continued their deep run with a 3–1 penalty shootout victory after the match ended in a 0–0 draw with Caroni Samba to advance into the quarterfinals.

Quarterfinals
The draw for the quarterfinals took place on 6 March 2012 and involved the 8 winning teams from the third round. The lowest ranked teams left in the competition were OJ's Soldado All-Stars of the Southern FA Premier Division, the third tier of Trinidad and Tobago football, and Scarborough Secondary of the Secondary Schools Football League. The eight remaining teams were from the following levels:

 3 from Level 1 (TT Pro League)
 3 from Level 2 (National Super League)
 1 from Level 3 (OJ's Soldado All-Stars of the Southern FA Premier Division)
 1 from the Secondary Schools Football League (Scarborough Secondary)

Matches in the quarterfinals were played on 11 March 2012. Caledonia AIA used goals from Devorn Jorsling and Ataullah Guerra to defeat Joe Public 2–0 and advance to the semifinal round. In addition, W Connection ended the cinderella run of Scarborough Secondary following a dominant 5–0 win with Hashim Arcia recording a hat-trick. Defence Force also easily advanced to the semifinals with a 5–0 triumph over St. Francois Nationals. In the only match involving teams outside the top flight, WASA from the National Super League defeated OJ's Soldado All-Stars 3–1.

Semifinals
The draw for the semifinals took place on 14 March 2012. The four remaining teams consisted of three clubs from the Pro League (1) which included Caledonia AIA, Defence Force, and W Connection. The other remaining team was WASA of the National Super League (2). Both semifinal matches took place at Manny Ramjohn Stadium on 18 March 2012.

On 18 March 2012 at the Manny Ramjohn Stadium, W Connection lost to Caledonia AIA 1–0 with a goal from Ataullah Guerra in the 35th minute to propel the Morvant/Laventille Stallions into the final. In the other semifinal match, Defence Force used first-half goals from Josimar Belgrave and Sean Narcis to defeat WASA 3–2.

Final
The final was played at Manny Ramjohn Stadium in Marabella, Trinidad on 25 March 2012. The match was decided between Caledonia AIA, who defeated W Connection 1–0 in the second semifinal match, and Defence Force who ended the giant-killing of WASA from the National Super League by a score of 3–2 in the other semifinal. Caledonia AIA raised the Trophy for the second time in their club's history (2008) after former soldier and striker Devorn Jorsling scored for the Morvant/Laventille Stallions against his former club, Defence Force, in the 81st minute to secure a hard fought 1–0 victory. The leading goal scorer of the tournament was jointly held by Michael Edwards of Defence Force and Andrew London of Club Sando. Edwards recorded five goals in a second round win over Mafeking United, whereas Andrew London scored four goals in the first round and followed with another goal in the third round.

References

External links
Official Website

Trinidad and Tobago Cup
Trinidad and Tobago Cup
Cup